Gustav Kirstein (born 24 February 1870 in Berlin; died 14 February 1934 in Leipzig) was a German publisher, writer, and art collector of Jewish descent.

Life 
Kirstein was the son of a doctor. He first studied pharmacy, graduated, worked as a pharmacy assistant for a year, and then turned to the publishing book trade. Later he worked for the publishing house E. A. Seemann, of which he became a partner on 1 October 1899. Later, he was initially managing director of the publishing house. In 1923, Ernst Arthur Elert Heinrich Seemann's son, Elert Seemann (1892-1989), became a partner in the management of the publishing house. He had joined the Nazi party at an early stage.

Kirstein was the founder and publisher of the journal Der Kunstmarkt (1904-1926) and the "Dehmel-Gesellschaft" as well as the owner of the Leipzig cliché company "Kirstein & Co." and "Wendler, Kirstein & Co." respectively, whose office was located at Hospitalstr. 11a in Leipzig. He wrote articles on copyright for the Börsenverein der Deutschen Buchhändler. Starting in May 1904, he was also a member of the German Book Trade Association.  Kirstein actively campaigned on the issue of copyright in the years from 1927 onwards for the retention of the 30-year term of protection for literature, and even conducted a collection of signatures for this purpose, to which more than 800 well-known personalities gave their signatures.

On 26 June 1922 Kirstein was awarded an honorary doctorate by the Technical University of Aachen "in recognition of his services to the dissemination and deepening of art historical research, which he has acquired as a publisher and as editor and director of art historical journals, and finally as an author of writings on art".

Art collector 
Kirstein was chairman of the "Leipziger Bibliophilen-Abend" from May 1912 until the beginning of 1930. Together with his wife Cläre "Clara" Therese (née Stein, 18 May 1885, to 1939), he was also active as an art collector. According to the Dutch Restitution Committee "Kirstein was a friend and patron of many leading artists of his day, including Max Liebermann, Lovis Corinth and Max Klinger. During his lifetime Gustav Kirstein accumulated a large art collection by such artists as Max Klinger, Max Liebermann, Edouard Manet, Adolph Menzel, Lovis Corinth, Käthe Kollwitz, Georg Kolbe, Carl Spitzweg and Hans Thoma."

Nazi persecution, suicide, seizure of art collection 
After the Nazis came to power in Germany in 1933, Kirstein was forced to give up all public offices. He was urged by Seemann to leave the publishing house. at the end of June 1933. When he died in 1934, his wife took over the management of the publishing house until its closure in 1938.

The Kirstein's art collection was confiscated by the Gestapo in 1939 and handed over to the Leipzig art gallery C.G. Boerner Forty-four works were placed with the storage firm Erhardt Schneider.  Therese Clara Kirstein committed suicide in 1939 after her escape to the United States was blocked.

Family 

Kirstein's marriage produced two daughters, who emigrated from Germany at an early age, Gabriele (born 1905) and Marianne (born 1907).

Restitution of Nazi-looted art 
In 1964 the Kirstein family requested compensation for seizures under the Nazis but their request was rejected by authorities.

However, in 1998 44 countries endorsed guidelines to re-examine museum collections and archives to search for the lost assets of Nazi Holocaust victims at the Washington Conference On Holocaust-Era Assets  and the attitude of the authorities changed. In 2000, two German museums returned more than 80 works of art to Kirstein's heirs. Restituted paintings included The Lute Player by Max Klinger and Walchensee, Johannisnacht by Lovis Corinth and Three Studies of Heads of Women (1883) by Max Klinger. The latter was restituted to the Kirstein heirs by the Museum der Bildenden Künste, Leipzig (then Städtisches Museum Leipzig).

In 2020, a provenance researcher at the Georg Schäfer Museum in northern Bavaria, in Germany, quit her job in a protest against the museum's failure to be serious about returning artworks with tainted provenances. Works from the Kirstein family's collection were among those that caused her concern.

Writings (selection) 

 
 
 Max Liebermann zum 60. Geburtstage. Vol. Neue Folge, 18. Jahrgang. E.A. Seemann. 1907. p. 237. 
 Neuere Arbeiten von Georg Kolbe. E. A. Seemann. 1908. p. 199. 
 Das Leben Adolph Menzels. E. A. Seemann. 1919

As publisher

 Die Welt Max Klingers. Furche. 1917. 
 Max Klinger : sechs farbige Wiedergaben seiner Werke. E. A. Seemanns Künstlermappen. E.A. Seemann. 1921.

Literature 

 
 
 Raubkunst: Peinliche Verzögerungen. In: Der Spiegel. Nr. 40, 2000 (online). 
 
 
 Kirstein, Gustav. In: Joseph Walk (Hrsg.): Kurzbiographien zur Geschichte der Juden 1918–1945. Saur, München 1988, ISBN 3-598-10477-4, S. 194.

External links 

 Geschäfts- und Gesellschaftsverträge zwischen E. A. Seemann und Gustav Kirstein („Am 1. Juli 1933 wurde der Gesellschaftsvertrag zwischen Elert Seemann und Gustav Kirstein für das Unternehmen E. A. Seemann gelöst. Letzterer musste die Firma verlassen und wurde mit dem Verlag Seemann & Co., der auf den Druck von Kunstblättern spezialisiert war, abgefunden.“ – archiv.sachsen.de)
 BINDING OPINION REGARDING THE DISPUTE ABOUT RESTITUTION OF THE DRAWING JEWISH QUARTER IN AMSTERDAM, BY MAX LIEBERMANN, CURRENTLY IN THE POSSESSION OF AMSTERDAM CITY COUNCIL Drawing Jewish Quarter in Amsterdam by Max Liebermann 
 Leipzig: Cläre und Gustav Kirstein (Trufanowstraße 8)
 Schriften von Kirstein, Gustav in der Staats- und Universitätsbibliothek Dresden
 Literatur von und über Gustav Kirstein in der Sächsischen Bibliografie

See also 
The Holocaust

Aryanization

List of claims for restitution for Nazi-looted art

Nazi Plunder

References 

1934 deaths
1870 births
People from Berlin
German art collectors
German booksellers
Patrons of the arts
Jewish art collectors
Persecution of Jews
Nazi-looted art
Art and cultural repatriation after World War II
Subjects of Nazi art appropriations
Suicides by Jews during the Holocaust
German publishers (people)